Acacia stipuligera is a tree or shrub belonging to the genus Acacia and the subgenus Juliflorae. It is native to arid and tropical parts of northern Australia.

Description
It has light to dark grey coloured bark that is longitudinally fissured and forms small flakes. The green, narrowly elliptically shaped phyllodes are flat and straight to shallowly incurved. Although it flowers across a wide time span over most of the continent, in Western Australia it is much more restricted, blooming only from May to September producing yellow flowers.

Taxonomy
The species was first formally described by the botanist Ferdinand von Mueller in 1859 as part of the work Contributiones ad Acaciarum Australiae Cognitionem as published in Journal of the Proceedings of the Linnean Society, Botany. It was reclassified as Racosperma stipuligerum by Leslie Pedley in 1987 but transferred back to the genus Acacia in 2006.

Distribution
A. stipuligera is found throughout central Queensland and the Northern Territory. 
In Western Australia the species is found in the Kimberley and Pilbara regions. It is found in flat and undulating areas where it grows in red sandy and loamy soils. It is often part of scrub or woodland communities often associated spinifex.

See also
List of Acacia species

References

stipuligera
Acacias of Western Australia
Flora of the Northern Territory
Flora of Queensland
Flora of New South Wales
Taxa named by Ferdinand von Mueller
Plants described in 1859